USS Stockton (DD-73), a , in commission in the United States Navy from 1917 to 1922 — seeing service in World War I — and briefly during 1940. She later served in the Royal Navy as HMS Ludlow during World War II. She was the second U.S. Navy ship named for Commodore Robert F. Stockton (1795–1866).

Construction and commissioning
Stockton was laid down on 16 October 1916 by William Cramp & Sons at Philadelphia, Pennsylvania, and launched on 17 July 1917, sponsored by Ellen Emelie De Martelly. She was commissioned on 26 November 1917.

Service history

United States Navy
Stockton spent the last year of World War I assigned to convoy escort and antisubmarine warfare duty, operating from Queenstown (now Cobh), Ireland. During that time, she engaged an Imperial German Navy U-boat on at least one occasion. On 30 March 1918, she and the destroyer  were escorting the troopship St. Paul on the Queenstown-Liverpool circuit, when Ericsson opened fire on a German submarine. The submerged submarine launched a torpedo at Stockton almost immediately thereafter, and the destroyer narrowly evaded it. The two destroyers dropped patterns of depth charges, but the U-boat managed to evade their attack and escaped. Later that night, Stockton collided with the ferry  near South Stack Light. Slieve Bloom sank on 31 March 1918 with the loss of one life,<ref>{{Cite newspaper The Times |title=The loss of the Slieve Bloom". |date=2 April 1918 |page=3 |issue=41753 |column=A }}</ref> and Stockton had to put into Liverpool for repairs.Stockton returned to the United States in 1919, and continued to serve with the fleet for the next three years. On 26 June 1922, she was decommissioned and laid up at Philadelphia.Stockton was recommissioned on 16 August 1940 and proceeded to Halifax, Nova Scotia, canada, where she was decommissioned on 23 August 1940 and turned over to the United Kingdom under the provisions of the Destroyers for Bases Agreement.Stocktonʼs name was struck from the U.S. Naval Vessel Register on 8 January 1941.

Royal Navy

The destroyer served the Royal Navy as HMS Ludlow (G57) during World War II until decommissioning in June 1945. Following decommissioning, Ludlow'' was beached in the Firth of Forth off Yellowcraigs beach, Fidra, Dirleton, East Lothian, Scotland, on 15 July 1945 for use as a rocket target by Royal Air Force aircraft. It is reputed that the first salvo of rockets hit her just below the waterline and sank her.

References

 

Caldwell-class destroyers
World War I destroyers of the United States
Ships built by William Cramp & Sons
1917 ships
Maritime incidents in 1918
Ships transferred from the United States Navy to the Royal Navy
Town-class destroyers of the Royal Navy
Town-class destroyers converted from Caldwell-class destroyers
World War II destroyers of the United Kingdom
Ships sunk as targets
Shipwrecks in the North Sea
Maritime incidents in July 1945